Beyla (N’ko: ߓߋߟߊ߫) is a town and urban sub-prefecture located in south eastern Guinea. It is the  capital of the Beyla prefecture of the Nzerekore region of Guinea.

Population 13,204 (2008 est)

Mining 

Beyla is the main town serving the Simandou iron ore project.
The mine is operated by a British-Australian mining corporation called the Rio Tinto Group. Its presence in Beyla has lasted approximately 17 years. The Rio Tinto Group has also invested about $700,000,000 USD towards the Guinea government for the purpose of exploring and likely prospecting of the mountain.

References 

Sub-prefectures of the Nzérékoré Region
Populated places in the Nzérékoré Region